Devadiga are a community from the districts of Udupi and Dakshina Kannada in the Indian state of Karnataka, Kerala and Maharashtra. They are temple servants and traditional musicians of Tulunadu. They follow the traditional Tulu system of matrilineal inheritance and have similar marriage ceremonies like Bunts. Traditionally they are vaishnavas.

Word Devadiga means "Devarannu Adisuvavaru" in Kannada. Which means they play musical instruments to make god happy.

References 

Indian castes
Social groups of Karnataka
Surnames of Indian origin